Laukkaing Township is a township located within Laukkaing District, Shan State, Myanmar. It is also part of the Kokang Self-Administered Zone. The principal town is Laukkai a.k.a. Laukkaing.

Geography
Laukkaing shares a border with Kongyan Township in the north, with the People's Republic of China in the north and east, with Kunlong Township in the south and with Kutkai Township in the west. Few plains can be seen in Laukkai, Mangtonpa, Yanlongkyaing, Pasinkyaw and Namhuhtan.

Rubber, lychee, mango, walnut and pear are grown in the area as poppy substitutes. Sugarcane, pineapple, corn, buckwheat, soybean and various vegetables are also grown.

There are 4 high schools and 17 primary schools. There is a 50 bedded hospital.

Further reading
 Topo Map of Kokang Self-Administered Zone - Mimu
 Shan (North) State, Myanmar - Mimu
Laukkaing Township - Shan State - Mimu

References

Townships of Shan State